Yankov Gap (Yankova Sedlovina \'yan-ko-va se-dlo-vi-'na\) is an ice-covered saddle linking Melnik Ridge and Bowles Ridge in eastern Livingston Island  in the South Shetland Islands, Antarctica.  The gap is at an elevation of 575 m and extends 1 km in the north-south direction from Samokov Knoll in Melnik Ridge to Asparuh Peak in Bowles Ridge.  Yankov Gap is part of the divide between the glacial catchments of the head of Kaliakra Glacier to the west and Struma Glacier to the east.

The gap was first crossed by the Bulgarians Lyubomir Ivanov and Doychin Vasilev from Camp Academia on 28 December 2004.  Named after Yordan Yankov, a  radio-engineer at St. Kliment Ohridski Base in several seasons since 1995.

Location

Maps
 L.L. Ivanov et al. Antarctica: Livingston Island and Greenwich Island, South Shetland Islands. Scale 1:100000 topographic map. Sofia: Antarctic Place-names Commission of Bulgaria, 2005.
 L.L. Ivanov. Antarctica: Livingston Island and Greenwich, Robert, Snow and Smith Islands. Scale 1:120000 topographic map.  Troyan: Manfred Wörner Foundation, 2009.

References
 Yankov Gap. SCAR Composite Antarctic Gazetteer
 Bulgarian Antarctic Gazetteer. Antarctic Place-names Commission. (details in Bulgarian, basic data in English)

External links
 Yankov Gap. Copernix satellite image

Mountain passes of Livingston Island